Silver Hill (also Moblissa Newton) is a very small settlement in the Demerara-Mahaica Region of Guyana,  up the Soesdyke-Linden Highway, which runs along the east bank of the Demerara River.

The village has a school, but has no electricity other than private Diesel generators. 

The residents make their living from harvesting wood products and farming the white sands of the area. Recently the area has been developing with resorts, agriculture and farming technology in the area. A few miles before Silver Hill is the Dalgin region that possess peanuts, watermelon and other fruit farmers.

Notes

References

Populated places in Demerara-Mahaica